Almost Summer  is the first album release by the Mike Love fronted band Celebration. The album was released in support of the motion picture of the same name. The album included the band's only charting single "Almost Summer" co-written by Love's Beach Boys bandmates Al Jardine and Brian Wilson.

Track listing

"Almost Summer" (Brian Wilson/Mike Love/Al Jardine) – 2:40
"Sad Sad Summer" (Love) – 3:44
"Cruisin’" (Love) – 2:10
"Lookin’ Good" (Ron Altbach) – 2:05
"Summer In The City" (John Sebastian/Mark Sebastian/Steve Boone) – 3:00
"It's O.K." (Wilson/Love) – 2:18
"Football" (Charles Lloyd/Altbach) – 1:32
"Island Girl" (Lloyd) – 7:24
"Christine and Bobby" (Altbach) – 3:47
"We Are the Future" (Laws/Holiday/Bolton/Womack) – 3:42
 Performed by High Inergy
"She Was a Lady" (Bill Pratt) – 2:35
 Performed by Fresh

Personnel
 Mike Love - lead vocals (1, 2, 3)
 Charles Lloyd - saxophone, flute
 Ron Altbach - Keyboards 
 Dave "Doc" Robinson - bass, backing and lead (5, 6) vocals
 Paul Fauerso - Vocals and Keyboards 
 Mike Kowalski - Drums, Percussion
 Ed Carter - Guitar 
 Wells Kelly - Bass 
 Gary Griffin - Keyboards
Additional musicians:
 Steve Douglas - Sax
 Rusty Ford - Bass
 Tom Smith - Drums
 Sterling Smith - Synthesizers
 Ed Tuleja - Guitars
 Dave Bunch - Guitars
 Maureen Love - Harp

Single
 "Almost Summer" - #28 Billboard Hot 100

References

Celebration (1970s band) albums
1978 debut albums
1978 soundtrack albums
MCA Records albums